Allochiton is a genus of upper Cambrian chitons with a circular head valve.

References

Chiton families
Cambrian molluscs
Monotypic mollusc genera
Cambrian animals of North America